Mica Peak is the name of two separate mountain summits in the United States located approximately  apart; one in Spokane County, Washington and the other in Kootenai County, Idaho. The two peaks are located along the same ridge, which separates the Spokane Valley and Rathdrum Prairie from the Palouse. The mountains have an elevation difference of only  and are the southernmost peaks of the Selkirk Mountains.

Other summits located along the same ridge include the  Round Mountain, the  Cable Peak, the  Shasta Butte,  and the  Blossom Mountain.

During the Prohibition Era Mica Peak was the site of numerous bootlegging operations. The mountainous and thickly forested terrain provided cover that allowed the bootleggers to hide their stills. Most were small, individual operations but some larger commercial endeavors existed as well. The mountain's location on the state line, which inconsistently demarcated in the area, made the location even more ideal for the illegal ventures as Idaho and Washington authorities could be easily tricked into believing the stills were located just outside of their jurisdiction.

Mica Peak (Idaho)
State Line is the closest city at  away.

The name Signal Point is derived from a ski lodge of the same name that operated on the northeast face of the mountain in the  The ski lodge utilized a rope tow and the lodge building can be seen as a dot on topographic maps from the time period but is no longer standing.

Mica Peak (Washington)

The mountain is the southernmost peak in the Selkirk range. The peak is home to the now-decommissioned Mica Peak Air Force Station. The northern slopes are drained by Saltese Creek. The mountain dominates the view to the east and southeast from the city of Spokane Valley.

See also
Mica Peak Air Force Station

References

External links
Montana Memory Project – Signal Point ski tow and lodge (photo)

Mountains of Spokane County, Washington
Mountains of Kootenai County, Idaho
Mountains of Idaho